Diaphus kora is a species of lanternfish found in the Southwest Pacific Ocean.

References

Myctophidae
Taxa named by Basil Nafpaktitis
Taxa named by Don A. Robertson
Taxa named by John Richard Paxton
Fish described in 1995
Fish of the Pacific Ocean